Jianghuai (pinyin: Jiānghuái) is a geographical area in China referring to the plain between the Yangtze and Huai Rivers, in the modern provinces of Anhui and Jiangsu.

Plains of China
Regions of China
Landforms of Jiangsu
Landforms of Anhui
Yangtze River
Huai River